The University of Abuja is a tertiary institution in the Nigerian capital, Abuja. It was established in January 1988 (under Decree No. 110 of 1992 as amended) as a dual-mode university with the mandate to run conventional and distance learning programmes. Academic work began in the university in 1990 with the matriculation of its pioneer students.

History
The university took off from a temporary site, made up of three blocks of building meant for a primary school in Gwagwalada, tagged the "mini - campus". Academic activities started on the mini - campus in 1990 after which the university was allocated an expanse of land covering over  along the Abuja city Airport road for the development of its main campus.

Relocation to the permanent site has been ongoing to-date. The campus now hosts three female and two male hostels housing thousands of students. However, the distance learning offices of the university are located within the Abuja municipality (Area 3 Garki) where contact sessions of the programme are also held.

Library 
The University Library was established in 1988 to support teaching, learning and research to meet the objectives of university of Abuja with information resources online and offline, it is the main library located in the main Campus alone Airport road, Abuja.

Academics
The university offers diploma, undergraduate and postgraduate degree programmes as well as a Centre for Distance Learning School which provides university education to those who cannot acquire such education through the regular university system and those interested in acquiring new knowledge and specialised skills.

A list of faculties and colleges currently at the University of Abuja include:

 Faculty of Agriculture
 Faculty of Art
 Faculty of Education
 Faculty of Engineering
 Faculty of Law
 Faculty of Management Sciences
 Faculty of Sciences
 Faculty of Social Sciences
 Faculty of Veterinary Medicine 
 School of Post Graduate Studies
 School of Remedial Studies 
 College of Health Sciences
 College of Medicine
 The Institute of Legislative Education

Council and Administration
The Key organs and officers involved in the administration and governance of the university are: the Governing Council, the Senate, the Congregation and the Convocation, the Vice-Chancellor, Two Deputy Vice Chancellors (Administration and Academic), the Registrar and Secretary to Council, the Bursar, the University Librarian, Deans of Faculties, Directors of Centres and Institutes and Heads of Department. All these organs and officials are supported by the Committee system which is the pivot of administration of the university.

The Governing Council
The Council consists of the Chairman who is also the Pro-Chancellor of the university, the Vice Chancellors (Administration and Academic) a representative of the Federal Ministry of Education, four persons appointed by the National Council of Ministers representing broad national interests, four persons appointed by the Senate from its members, one persons each appointed by the Congregation and the Convocation among their members and the Registrar as Secretary to Council. The council is the highest policy-making organ of the university.

The Senate
The Senate is the highest University authority on academic matters. It is the general function of the Senate to organise and control teaching at the university and the admission and discipline of students, as well as the promotion of research. The Senate comprises the Vice-Chancellor as Chairman, the Deputy Vice-Chancellors, the Professors, the University Librarian, Deans, Directors and Deputy Deans, Heads of Academic Departments, one member of academic staff representing each Faculty and the Registrar as Secretary.

The Congregation
The Congregations is made up of all members of staff of the university who were university graduates by appointment. The Vice-Chancellor is its chairman and the Registrar is Secretary. Congregation meetings, being statutory, are called to afford members opportunities to have a say in matters affecting their welfare.

The university runs a consultancy services sub-degree program and an institute of education to cater for the professional needs of teachers and specialised needs of government education bodies; it provides avenues for the establishment of linkages on education matters with organisations and institutions within and outside Nigeria.

Gallery

Notable alumni

 Chukwuebuka Anyaduba - Lawyer, Filmmaker and Humanitarian
 Jake Okechukwu Effoduh - Radio Personality, Human Rights Activist and Lawyer
 Olumide Idowu - Youth campaigner and climate change activist
 JaySynths – Record producer
 Kanayo O. Kanayo - Actor, Film maker and Lawyer
 Imaan Sulaiman-Ibrahim – Director-General of NAPTIP

References

External links
 
 Universities Socketworks College Portal

 
Universities and colleges in Nigeria
Educational institutions established in 1988
Education in Abuja
Public universities in Nigeria
1988 establishments in Nigeria